Rajesh Gehlot (born 27 September 1976) is an Indian former cricketer. He played five List A matches for Delhi between 1999 and 2001.

See also
 List of Delhi cricketers

References

External links
 

1976 births
Living people
Indian cricketers
Delhi cricketers
Cricketers from Delhi